The Madagascar wood rail (Mentocrex kioloides), also known as the kioloides rail, is a species of bird in the family Sarothruridae. It is endemic to forests, often in wet areas, in northern and eastern Madagascar. The Madagascar wood rail is a secretive and shy species, often showing elusive behavior, such as running away from the slightest disturbances. This has contributed to a lack of study on this species; a reason why it is not that well known.

This species was formerly placed in the genus Canirallus together with Tsingy wood rail and the grey-throated rail. A molecular genetic study published in 2019 found that the grey-throated rail is not closely related to the wood rails. The wood rails were therefore moved to the resurrected genus Mentocrex.

References

Mentocrex
Birds described in 1845
Taxonomy articles created by Polbot